Phragmataecia fuscifusa is a species of moth of the family Cossidae. It is found in Sierra Leone and Nigeria.

References

Moths described in 1910
Phragmataecia
Moths of Africa
Insects of West Africa